The 1979 Basque foral elections were held on Tuesday, 3 April 1979, to elect the 1st Juntas Generales of Álava, Biscay and Gipuzkoa. All 228 seats in the three Juntas Generales were up for election. The elections were held simultaneously with local elections all throughout Spain.

Overall

Foral deputation control
The following table lists party control in the foral deputations.

Historical territories

Álava

Biscay

Gipuzkoa

References

Basque
1979